Ernesto García Pinheiro (born 14 June 1969) is a Cuban water polo player. He competed in the men's tournament at the 1992 Summer Olympics.

References

1969 births
Living people
Cuban male water polo players
Olympic water polo players of Cuba
Water polo players at the 1992 Summer Olympics
Place of birth missing (living people)
Pan American Games bronze medalists for Cuba
Water polo players at the 1995 Pan American Games
Pan American Games medalists in water polo
Medalists at the 1995 Pan American Games